Barry Rubin (born June 25, 1957) is the former Head Strength and Conditioning Coach of the Kansas City Chiefs of the National Football League. He is a member of the USA Strength and Conditioning Coaches Hall of Fame.

Early life
Rubin was born in Monroe, Louisiana, the son of Sam and Eileen Rubin. He attended Neville High School, lettering three years in football (winning all-district honors as a running back and punter), baseball, and basketball and twice in track.

College football career
In 1976, Rubin began playing for the LSU Tigers football team as a running back and punter.

Following the 1977 season, he transferred to Northwestern State University, where he was a punter and a tight end, and received his B.A. in 1981. While there, he played alongside future NFL players Bobby Hebert, Mark Duper, Joe Delaney, and Gary Reasons. In 1979, he set a school record with a 75-yard punt, and was named to the Jewish All-American team.

Coaching career
Rubin began coaching as a graduate assistant at Northeast Louisiana University in 1981. He became Assistant Strength Coach the following year. In 1984, he was promoted to Strength Coach and remained in that position until 1985. After serving as Strength Coach at LSU from 1987 to 1990, Rubin returned to Northeast Louisiana University in 1994.

In 1995, Rubin was hired as Strength and Conditioning Assistant with the Green Bay Packers. While serving in that position, he was a member of the Super Bowl XXXI Champion Packers, as well as the team that won the NFC Championship the following year. He was promoted to Head Strength and Conditioning Coach in 1999. Rubin remained with the Packers until 2005.

In 2010, he was named Head Strength and Conditioning Coach of the Philadelphia Eagles. He later assumed the same role for the Kansas City Chiefs, after Andy Reid was hired there as head coach. In 2019, Rubin won Super Bowl LIV when the Chiefs defeated the San Francisco 49ers 31-20. In 2022, Rubin won Super Bowl LVII when the Chiefs defeated the Philadelphia Eagles 38-35.

Halls of Fame

In 2003, Rubin was inducted into the USA Strength and Conditioning Coaches Hall of Fame.  He was inducted into the Northwestern (La.) State Hall of Fame in 2014.

References

Sportspeople from Monroe, Louisiana
Philadelphia Eagles coaches
Green Bay Packers coaches
Louisiana–Monroe Warhawks football coaches
LSU Tigers football coaches
American strength and conditioning coaches
Northwestern State Demons football players
LSU Tigers football players
American football punters
American football running backs
American football tight ends
1957 births
Living people
Jewish American sportspeople
Kansas City Chiefs coaches
21st-century American Jews